Zoë Strachan (born 1975) is a Scottish novelist and journalist. She also teaches creative writing at the University of Glasgow.

Biography
Strachan grew up in Kilmarnock, Ayrshire. She studied Archaeology and Philosophy at the University of Glasgow and earned a MPhil in Creative Writing at the universities of Glasgow and Strathclyde. She later herself became a creative writing tutor at the University of Glasgow. Strachan lives in Glasgow with her partner, the novelist Louise Welsh.

Work
Strachan's work has been published in New Writing 15, Bordercrossing Berlin, The Edinburgh Companion to Contemporary Scottish Literature, and The Antigonish Review. In 2006 she was named the first Writer-in-Residence at the National Museum of Scotland in Edinburgh.

Her first novel, Negative Space, was published in 2002 by Picador. It won the Betty Trask Award in 2003 and was shortlisted for the Saltire First Book of the Year Award. Her second novel, in 2004, was Spin Cycle. In 2008 Strachan was awarded the Hermann Kesten Stipendium fellowship. In June 2009, she was on study leave, working mainly in Germany on a third novel, Play Dead. In 2014, she appeared as editor of an anthology of LGBT writing called Out There, published by Freight Books.

In 2011, Strachan took part in the International Writing Program Fall Residency at the University of Iowa in Iowa City, Iowa.

She and Louise Welsh contributed a short story, "Anyone Who Had a Heart", to Glasgow Women's Library's 21 Revolutions Project, in which 21 writers and 21 artists were chosen to create works for the 21st anniversary of Glasgow Women's Library.

References

External links
Official site

1975 births
Living people
Scottish LGBT writers
People from Kilmarnock
Scottish scholars and academics
Scottish women novelists
Scottish opera librettists
Women opera librettists
International Writing Program alumni
20th-century Scottish women writers
21st-century Scottish women writers
21st-century women musicians
Alumni of the University of Strathclyde
20th-century Scottish novelists
21st-century Scottish novelists
Scottish journalists
Scottish women journalists
Alumni of the University of Glasgow